Marcelo Arévalo and Miguel Ángel Reyes-Varela were the defending champions, but lost in the first round to Hans Hach Verdugo and Dennis Novikov.

Romain Arneodo and Hugo Nys won the title, defeating Dominic Inglot and Austin Krajicek in the final, 7–5, 5–7, [16–14]. They became the first all - Monégasque pair to win an ATP title.

Seeds

Draw

Draw

References

External links
 Main Draw

Los Cabos Open - Doubles